Phyllonorycter malayana is a moth of the family Gracillariidae. It is known from Pahang, Malaysia.

The wingspan is 6.2-6.8 mm.

The larvae feed on Engelhardia spicata. They mine the leaves of their host plant. The mine has the form of an elliptical or oblong, typically tentiform blotch-mine found on the upper side of the leaf, usually on the leaf-vein, with the upper epidermis of the mining part having a longitudinal wrinkle in the middle. Pupation takes place inside the mine-cavity. The pupa is enclosed with a whitish, ellipsoidal cocoon, which is covered with grains of frass.

References

malayana
Moths of Asia
Moths described in 1993